Roma Asrani is an Indian model turned actress who mainly appears in Malayalam-language films. She has starred in over 25 films. She is popularly known mononymously as Romah.

Life

Roma Asrani was born to Sindhi parents in Trichy, Tamil Nadu. She received her first Filmfare Award for Best Supporting Actress for her role in Notebook. 

Her second film was July 4 (2007), directed by Joshiy.  Her movie Chocolate (2007) with Prithviraj was successful.

She has also acted in a music video.

Roma has also acted in the Tamil movie Kathale En Kathale (2006). She made her Kannada début with Aramane (2007), starring Ganesh in the lead. Further, she reappeared in the Telugu industry after a break in the movie Chalaki in 2010.

Awards
Asianet Film Awards
 2006  - Asianet Award for Best Female New Face of the Year - Notebook
 2008  - Best Star Pair Award, Utharaswayamvaram
 2009  - Best Star Pair Award, Minnaminnikoottam, Shakespeare M.A. Malayalam

Filmfare Awards South
 2006 - Filmfare Award for Best Supporting Actress (Malayalam) - Notebook

Amrita Film Awards
 2009 -  Amrita Film Award for Best Character Actress - Minnaminnikoottam

Filmography

Music Videos

Television 

2007. Super Dancer Junior (Amrita TV) as Judge
2013. Sundari niyum sundaran njnanum (Asianet) as Judge
2015-2017 . Comedy stars season 2 (Asianet) as Judge
2017 .Lal Salam (Amrita TV) as Dancer

References

External links
 
 

Living people
Female models from Tamil Nadu
21st-century Indian actresses
Actresses in Tamil cinema
Actresses in Malayalam cinema
Actresses in Kannada cinema
Filmfare Awards South winners
Indian film actresses
Sindhi people
Actresses in Telugu cinema
Year of birth missing (living people)